Jacques Mirko Oudin (7 October 1939 – 21 March 2020) was a French politician.

Biography
Jacques' parents are Jean Oudin, ambassador of France, and Sophie Yablonska-Oudin, Ukrainian travel writer and photographer. Jacques was born on 7 October 1939, in Da Nang, when his father served in French diplomatic corps.

Jacques Oudin was member of the Senate of France from 1986 to 2004, representing the department of Vendée.

Died in France, on 21 March 2020 (at the age of 80) from COVID-19.

Honors
  Knight of Legion of Honour
  Officer of Ordre national du Mérite (2009)
  Knight of Order of Agricultural Merit
  Knight of Ordre des Palmes académiques

References

1939 births
2020 deaths
French Senators of the Fifth Republic
Senators of Vendée
Judges of the Court of Audit (France)
Chevaliers of the Légion d'honneur
Officers of the Ordre national du Mérite
Knights of the Order of Agricultural Merit
Deaths from the COVID-19 pandemic in France
HEC Paris alumni
Sciences Po alumni
École nationale d'administration alumni